Chris Chapman (Born June 15, 1981) is a television Producer-Director and Writer. Chapman is best known for his BAFTA-nominated BBC documentary 'Stammer School', as well as producing and directing Doctor Who documentaries for the BBC DVD and blu-ray range and various different factual series for broadcast including CBBC's 'Our School', BBC1's 'Countryfile' and 'Fantastic Beasts: A Natural History' with Stephen Fry. He is also the writer of Doctor Who audio drama for Big Finish.

Granada Factual North 

In 2005, whilst still studying at Newcastle University, Chapman was hired as a Junior Researcher at Granada Factual North. His first project was Channel 4's 'The 100 Greatest Family Films', followed by ITV1's 'The Best Ever Ads 2'. Promoted to Researcher, Chapman worked on Film4's launch show '50 Films to See Before You Die' and ITV1's 'Raiders of the Lost Archive'.

Dene Films 

In 2007, with the closure of Granada's Newcastle base, Chapman took up the role of Assistant Producer with Dene Films. Here, his script work on short film 'The Conkerers' earned him a Royal Television Society Award. Chapman was promoted to Producer-Director in 2008, and directed various films for non-broadcast clients, including the RTS-award-winning 'Meningitis Matters' for Newcastle University. Chapman was awarded 'Best Newcomer' by the RTS, and went on to write and produce the award-winning films 'Ghost Street', 'Help Yourself' and 'Edge of Empire: The Eagle's Eye' working alongside director, Steven Boyle. Chapman started pitching television ideas in 2009, and (working with producer, Claire Storey) this led to the commission of the CBBC film 'Stammer School' in 2010. Chapman directed the film, featuring Michael Palin, which went on to earn a Children's BAFTA nomination for Best Factual. He followed this with the award-winning 'The Last Cast' for BBC1 and 'I Am Ethan' for CBBC. Chapman won the RTS production craft award in 2013, the same year that he decided to leave Dene Films and go freelance.

Doctor Who 

During his time at Dene Films, Chapman - a lifelong Doctor Who fan - started making documentaries for the classic Doctor Who DVD range. Between 2009 and 2014, nearly 40 of Chapman's productions were released, including the Doctor Who Magazine readers poll-winning 'Looking for Peter', presented by Toby Hadoke - as well as the follow-up films 'Living with Levene' and 'Hadoke Vs HAVOC'. Along with Niel Bushnell, Chapman produced the animated reconstructions of 'The Ice Warriors' episodes 2 and 3 for their DVD release, and appears on the making-of documentary that accompanies them. In November 2013, Chapman produced many of the VT films seen in BBC3's 'Doctor Who: The Afterparty'.

In May 2018, it was announced that Chapman would produce new documentary content for the BBC's Doctor Who blu-ray box set releases under the banner of his own company, Moon Balloon Productions. Chapman's work with this new range included the films 'A Weekend with Waterhouse', 'Showman: The Life of John Nathan-Turner', 'Looking for Lennie', 'The Writers' Room' series, 'Keeping up with the Joneses', 'The Doctor's Table' series, 'Whose Doctor Who Revisited', 'Our Sarah Jane: The Life of Elisabeth Sladen', 'Devil's Weekend', 'The Direct Route', 'Terrance & Me - with Frank Skinner' and the Royal Television Society award-winning 'The Doctor Who Cookbook - Revisited'.

Freelance 

Chapman left Dene Films and turned freelance in Spring 2013. His first project was 'One Way Ticket' for CBBC, followed by mini-series 'The Duke & I' for ITV1. Chapman then worked as a producer-director for the 15-part CBBC series 'Our School', which he returned to for a second season in 2015, and then in the role of Series Director for its third run in 2016/17. He returned to the series in 2018 to produce a new mini-series of special 'catch up' episodes. He has frequently returned to the series as an Edit Producer.

Chapman's other work during this time included the BBC1 series 'Paul O'Grady: The Sally Army & Me', Sky Living's 'Who'd Be a Billionaire' and ITV1's 'What Would Be Your Miracle?' 

In 2018 and 2019, Chapman completed several stints with the Development team at the BBC's Natural History Unit in Bristol.

From 2019, Chapman became a regular director with BBC1's 'Countryfile', specialising in the Adam's Farm segments of the programme. He filmed for the programme throughout the first year of the Covid Pandemic, from April 2020 to early 2021.

In Spring 2021, Chapman was one of the directors on the BBC2 series 'Our Wild Adventures', featuring Chris Packham, Steve Backshall and Liz Bonnin. 

In Winter 2021, Chapman directed the BBC1 documentary 'Fantastic Beasts: A Natural History' presented by Stephen Fry. The programme aired in March 2022.

Big Finish 

In February 2016, Chapman was commissioned by Big Finish to write the Doctor Who story 'The Memory Bank' for their release 'The Memory Bank & Other Stories', starring Peter Davison and Mark Strickson. The story was recorded on Wednesday 27 April 2016, and was released in October 2016.

In January 2017, Chapman was commissioned to write the 4-part Doctor Who story 'The Middle' starring Colin Baker's 6th Doctor with Miranda Raison as Constance and Lisa Greenwood as Flip, alongside guest stars Mark Heap and Sheila Reid. The story was recorded on the 1st and 5 June and was released in November 2017.

In August 2017, Chapman was commissioned to write the 4-part Doctor Who story 'Iron Bright', starring Colin Baker, for release in June 2018. It was recorded on the 16 and 17 January 2018.

In December 2017, Chapman was commissioned to write the 2-part UNIT story 'Hosts of the Wirrn' for the Revisitations box set, due to be released in November 2018 and starring Jemma Redgrave and Ingrid Oliver. The story was recorded on the 18 and 19 June 2018.

Chapman went on to write the 5th Doctor story 'Warzone', as well as the 6th Doctor adventures 'Scorched Earth' and 'Plight of the Pimpernel'.

He would write again for the 6th Doctor with the story 'Elevation' on the Eleven box set. 

Chapman has written the Tom Baker story 'The Friendly Invasion' which is due for release in 2023.

Personal life 

Chapman married Nottingham-born Julia Filsell on Saturday 22 March 2014 at Kelmarsh Hall, Northampton. The pair met in 2004, when Filsell became one of Chapman's film reviewers for Newcastle University magazine, Pulp. They live together in Bristol, where Filsell works as a digital content strategist.

They have a daughter, Edie Filsell-Chapman, who was born in October 2018.

References

English film directors
English film producers
1981 births
Alumni of Newcastle University
Living people